Oleksandr Vasyliovich Kukurba (18 September 1994 – 26 July 2022) was a Ukrainian military officer, major of the Air Force of the Armed Forces of Ukraine, a participant in the Russo-Ukrainian War. Hero of Ukraine (2022), recipient of the Order of Bohdan Khmelnytsky II and III class.

Biography 

Kukurba studied at the Nizhniy Verbizh comprehensive school (p. Nizhniy Verbizh, Kolomyysky district, Ivano-Frankivsk region).

He completed his military service as the head of intelligence at the headquarters of the 299th tactical aviation brigade of the Armed Forces of Ukraine.

During the repulse of the Russian invasion of Ukraine, he flew 100 sorties, destroyed more than 20 tanks and about 50 combat units of armored vehicles and other means, as well as more than 300 enemy personnel.

He died in battle for Ukraine on 26 July 2022. The Nizhniy Verbizh community declared 27–29 July to be days of mourning. Kukurba was buried in his native village on 29 July 2022.

Awards 
 the title Hero of Ukraine with the awarding of the «Golden Star» order (14 April 2022) — for personal courage and heroism, shown in the defense of state sovereignty and territorial integrity of Ukraine.
 Order of Bohdan Khmelnytskyi II class (6 July 2022) — for personal courage and selfless actions shown in the defense of state sovereignty and territorial integrity of Ukraine, loyalty to the military oath.
 Order of Bohdan Khmelnytskyi III class (22 March 2022) — for personal courage and selfless actions shown in the defense of the state sovereignty and territorial integrity of Ukraine, loyalty to the military oath.

Notes

Sources 
 https://www.pravda.com.ua/eng/news/2022/07/27/7360489/

1994 births
2022 deaths
Ukrainian Air Force officers
People from Ivano-Frankivsk Oblast
Ukrainian military personnel killed in the 2022 Russian invasion of Ukraine
Recipients of the Order of Gold Star (Ukraine)
Recipients of the Order of Bohdan Khmelnytsky, 2nd class
Recipients of the Order of Bohdan Khmelnytsky, 3rd class